Isobutyl cyanoacrylate is an isomer of butyl cyanoacrylate. It is used in medical procedures either to close incisions and lacerations without the use of sutures, or as an adjunct to strengthen the suturing. This use is possible because it is a bactericidal liquid monomer which, in the
presence of small amounts of moisture, rapidly polymerizes to form a strong adhesive.

References

Cyanoacrylate esters
Monomers
Adhesives